Caragiu is an Aromanian surname that may refer to:

  (1929–2018), Romanian sculptor of Aromanian descent
  (1927–2009), Romanian linguist of Aromanian descent
 Toma Caragiu (1925–1977), Romanian actor of Aromanian descent

Aromanian-language surnames